High Birkwith is a hamlet in the Craven district of North Yorkshire, England. It is located north of the village of Horton in Ribblesdale and in the same civil parish.

References

Hamlets in North Yorkshire